Negativity is the fifth album by American indie-rock band Deer Tick. The album was recorded in Portland, Oregon with Los Lobos' Steve Berlin. Writing began in 2012 during a challenging time in John McCauley's personal life. Album artwork photography by Anna Webber. It is the band's first release on Canadian record label Arts & Crafts.

Track listing

References

External links
Official Website
Deer Tick @ Partisan Record s

2012 albums
Deer Tick (band) albums
Partisan Records albums